Fazlı Kocabaş (born 1 January 1990) is a Belgian footballer who currently plays for Grez-Doiceau as a centre back.

Career
After leaving Roeselare, Kocabaş joined R.E. Virton.

References

External links
 
 

1990 births
Living people
Belgian people of Turkish descent
Footballers from Brussels
Association football central defenders
Belgian footballers
K.A.S. Eupen players
Standard Liège players
Royale Union Saint-Gilloise players
Oud-Heverlee Leuven players
Kayseri Erciyesspor footballers
Adana Demirspor footballers
R. Wallonia Walhain Chaumont-Gistoux players
K.S.V. Roeselare players
FC Swift Hesperange players
R.E. Virton players
Challenger Pro League players
Belgian Pro League players
Süper Lig players
Expatriate footballers in Turkey
Belgian expatriate sportspeople in Turkey
Belgium under-21 international footballers
Belgium youth international footballers